Gordon Blair is a Distinguished Professor of Distributed Systems in the School of Computing and Communications at Lancaster University. He is also the co-director of the Centre of Excellence in Environmental Data Science (CEEDS).

Gordon Blair is co-author of Distributed systems: concepts and design, a popular textbooks on distributed systems. His research focuses on reflective and adaptive middleware, and model-driven engineering. His research, with over 300 papers published, has been cited over 19,000 times. He is joint Editor-in-Chief of the Journal of Internet Services and Applications.

Education 

Gordon Blair received a BSc and PhD in Computer Science, in 1980 and 1983, respectively, and both from Strathclyde University.

Selected works

References 

Date of birth missing (living people)
British computer scientists
Alumni of the University of Strathclyde
Academics of Lancaster University
Year of birth missing (living people)
Living people